The McDonnell XP-67 "Bat" or "Moonbat" was a prototype for a twin-engine, long-range, single-seat interceptor aircraft for the United States Army Air Forces. Although the design was conceptually advanced, it was beset by numerous problems and never approached its anticipated level of performance. The project was cancelled after the sole completed prototype was destroyed by an engine fire.

Design and development

Origins
In 1940, the U.S. Army Air Corps issued Request for Proposal R-40C, requesting designs for a high-speed, long-range, high-altitude interceptor intended to destroy enemy bombers. The specifications were very bold, encouraging manufacturers to produce radical aircraft that would outperform any existing fighter in the world at the time. The aerospace parts manufacturer McDonnell Aircraft, eager to begin manufacturing its own aircraft, responded to the proposal with drawings and specifications of the proposed Model I, which would be powered by an unusual geared drivetrain with a single Allison V-3420 engine buried in the fuselage powering twin wing-mounted pusher propellers in the wings. However, 22 other manufacturers also issued proposals to meet the Army's request; the McDonnell proposal had relatively unimpressive anticipated performance, and its odd drivetrain was unproven. The Model I fell in 21st place when the 23 proposals were examined and scored. The proposals that were accepted included the similarly ill-fated XP-54, XP-55, and XP-56. Despite the apparent setback, Air Corps leaders were impressed by the nascent company's efforts, and granted McDonnell a $3,000 contract to re-engineer the aircraft.

Final design
McDonnell engineers returned on 30 June 1940 with the Model II, which was also rejected, so it was reworked into the Model IIa, which emerged on 24 April 1941. The new design was powered by a more traditional layout, a pair of engines in wing-mounted nacelles with four-bladed propellers in a tractor configuration. However, the design was still quite ambitious; the design team tried to maintain a true airfoil section through the center fuselage, merge the rear portions of the engine nacelles with the wing, and radically fillet all edges of the fuselage and nacelles into the wings in an effort to reduce drag. The design used laminar airfoil sections throughout. McDonnell designers promised that the design would deliver a top speed of 472 mph (760 km/h) with a gross weight of 18,600 lb (8,440 kg), although the anticipated gross weight was soon increased to a somewhat more realistic 20,000 lb (9,070 kg).

On 30 September 1941, the USAAF granted McDonnell a $1,508,596 contract, plus an $86,315 fee, for two prototypes, a wind tunnel model, and associated engineering data.  The Model IIa was designated as the XP-67. The production aircraft was intended to have a pressurized cockpit, an innovation at the time. A number of armament configurations were considered including six .50 in (12.7 mm) machine guns, four 20 mm (.79 in) cannon, and even a 75 mm (2.95 in) cannon before the configuration of six 37 mm (1.46 in) M4 cannon was chosen. Power would be provided by two Continental XIV-1430-1 inverted V-12 engines, fitted with turbosuperchargers, and the engine exhaust gases would augment thrust.

Testing

An extensive aerodynamic test program of the numerous advanced aspects of the design was begun by McDonnell, NACA, and the University of Detroit. The design demanded skin that was perfectly smooth and precisely shaped to maintain its laminar-flow characteristics, mandating the development of new construction techniques, as the company had never produced an entire aircraft before. Wind tunnel testing uncovered problems with engine cooling airflow through the engine nacelles, which were never fully resolved. Difficulties were also encountered in obtaining engines, as wartime production demands hampered Continental's efforts to deliver running examples of the experimental XIV-1430 engines to competing aircraft test programs. The project was also delayed by intense competition for testing time at the NACA wind tunnel facility in Langley, Virginia.

The first XP-67, 42-11677, was ready for ground trials on 1 December 1943. The aircraft was fitted with XIV-1430-17/19 engines and General Electric D-23 turbo-superchargers but no pressurization equipment or armament was installed. On 8 December, the aircraft was damaged by fires in both engine nacelles, caused by a malfunction of the exhaust manifold slip rings. By 6 January 1944, the damage was repaired and the XP-67 made its first flight, which ended after six minutes due to engine trouble. After modifications were made to the engine installations, two test flights were carried out. On the fourth flight, the engine bearings burned out when the engines were accidentally overspeeded.

By this time, it was becoming obvious that the XP-67 was hampered by a serious lack of power. The engines were only delivering 1,060 hp (790 kW), well short of their promised 1,350 hp (1,007 kW) rating. Company founder Jim McDonnell, frustrated by engine procurement delays and the XI-1430's subpar output, began to campaign for funding to re-engine the prototype with a pair of Allison or Rolls-Royce piston engines augmented by auxiliary Westinghouse turbojets in the aft nacelles. Although McDonnell promised a very impressive 500 mph (805 km/h) top speed with the new powerplants, the Army rejected the proposal, demanding more testing of the existing design. As a result of wind tunnel tests, the tailplanes were raised 12 in (31 cm) while the XP-67 waited for replacement engines.

Trials
On 23 March 1944, flight trials restarted. U.S. Army Air Forces pilots finally got to fly the aircraft on 11 May 1944, and judged the cockpit layout fair and ground handling satisfactory, but deemed the aircraft underpowered due to its poor initial rate of climb, slow acceleration, and long takeoff roll, particularly when operating with only one engine. Other flight characteristics were generally good during gentle maneuvers; stick forces were light, roll rate was adequate, and control was effective at all speeds with good longitudinal stability. However, a tendency to dutch roll was prevalent. The prototype also displayed several disturbing behaviors as its stall speed was approached. It began to buffet well above the actual stall speed, it felt tail-heavy in fast turns, and its nose would tuck upwards during the stall. The problems were serious enough that test pilots declined to test the XP-67's spin characteristics, fearing that a spin might be unrecoverable. This irregular and unstable stall behavior has been attributed to advanced aerodynamic principles that were not fully counteracted until the advent of electronic stability controls years later. Although the final flight test report was generally positive, the aircraft's maneuverability was deemed inferior to existing types such as the North American P-51 Mustang.

Upon return to the factory, the cooling ducts were reworked. Several problems were cured during the ensuing test flights, but the engines continued to be plagued by chronic overheating and deficient power output. The XP-67 only reached a confirmed top speed of 405 mph (652 km/h), which was far short of its promised top speed of 472 mph (760 km/h), and was unremarkable compared to other fighters in service at the time.

Cancellation

On 6 September 1944, the starboard engine of the XP-67 caught fire during a test flight, and test pilot E.E. Elliot executed an emergency landing at Lambert Field in St. Louis, Missouri. He attempted to park the craft pointing into the wind to blow the flames away from the airframe, but the starboard main landing gear brakes failed, pivoting the XP-67 so the flames blew directly towards the aft fuselage. Elliot escaped safely, but the blaze gutted the fuselage, engine, nacelle, and starboard wing; the aircraft was a total loss.

The destruction of the lone flying prototype dealt a serious blow to the entire program because the second prototype was only 15% complete at the time. Army leaders decided to reevaluate the XP-67, ultimately deciding on 13 September that it offered no significant advantages over existing fighters already in service. The project was canceled, the remains of the first prototype scrapped, and work halted on the second prototype.

Specifications (XP-67)

See also

References

Notes

Citations

Bibliography
 Boyne, Walter J. The Best of Wings. Dulles, Virginia, USA: Brassey's, Inc, 2001. .
 Francillon, René J. McDonnell Douglas Aircraft since 1920. London: Putnam & Company Ltd., 1979. .
 Mesko, Jim. FH Phantom/F2H Banshee in action. Carrollton, Texas, USA: Squadron/Signal Publications, Inc, 2002. .
 Richardson, Steve & Mason, Peggy. McDonnell XP-67 "Moonbat". (X-Planes, Vol. 17.) Oxford: Osprey Publishing, 2022.

External links

 Several pictures of the XP-67 42-11677 on 1000aircraftphotos.com
 "Too Hot to Handle: McDonnell XP-67 Moonbat". Air & Space Magazine
 

Blended wing body
McDonnell P-67 Bat
P-067 Bat
Cancelled military aircraft projects of the United States
Mid-wing aircraft
Aircraft first flown in 1944
Twin piston-engined tractor aircraft